Senator McGuire may refer to:

Barbara McGuire (politician) (fl. 2000s–2010s), Arizona State Senate
Lesil McGuire (born 1971), Alaska State Senate
Mary Jo McGuire (born 1956), Minnesota State Senate
Mike McGuire (politician) (born 1979), California State Senate
Pat McGuire (politician) (fl. 2000s–2010s), Illinois State Senate